Whinstanes railway station is a former railway station on the Pinkenba railway line in Brisbane, Australia. The station closed in 1976, as it was merged with Doomben station in 1977. This was due to the expense of raising higher level platforms of two stations adjacent to each other and for a time the new station was known as Whinstanes-Doomben, until the "Whinstanes" name was dropped after the line reopened in 1998, following closure of all passenger services in 1993.

References

Disused railway stations in Brisbane